George McKinley Reneau (May 18, 1902 – June 5, 1938) was an American blind street musician who became one of country music's earliest recording artists. Known as "The Blind Musician of the Smoky Mountains", Reneau recorded more than 50 songs on the Vocalion and Edison labels in the mid-1920s. While he is credited on his early recordings as a solo artist on vocals, guitar and harmonica, the singing on many if not most of his songs was by an uncredited Gene Austin, a vaudville performer and Tin Pan Alley composer who would become one of the most successful recording artists of the era.

Musical career

Reneau was born on May 18, 1902, in Dandridge, Jefferson County, Tennessee, between the Cumberland Plateau and the Smoky Mountains on the state's eastern border with North Carolina. While not much is known about his early life, Reneau is believed to have been born blind. At an early age, he attended the Nashville School for the Blind and eventually relocated from Dandridge to nearby Knoxville. Reneau, who began playing guitar and harmonica in his late teens or early 20s and later learned to play the banjo, became a street performer in the Market House area of the city's downtown.

In early 1924, the manager of the phonograph and record department in a Knoxville furniture store recommended Reneau to Vocalion Records, which was looking for new talent to record. Traveling to the company's studios in New York City several times over the next two years, Reneau recorded 50 songs for the label. While he was given solo credit on his Vocalion recordings, scholars later determined the vocalist on many of the releases was actually Gene Austin, since Reneau's harmonica playing can often be heard during the singing.

By late 1925, when he recorded the last of his Vocalion releases, Reneau was doing all of his own singing. Over this period, he also re-recorded 10 of his songs for the Edison label as the Blue Ridge Duo with Austin as vocalist. After his contract with Vocalion ended, he teamed up with Lester McFarland, another blind musician from Knoxville and a championship fiddler, and in 1927, the two recorded several sides for minor labels as the Gentry Brothers.

Between recording sessions, Reneau continued to perform on the streets of Knoxville, supporting himself, his wife and two step-children. In the summer of 1925, he was arrested for violating the city's anti-begging law as well as for drunkenness. The latter charge was dismissed, and Reneau was found not guilty of begging by a magistrate who was sitting in for the regular judge. When the police arrested Reneau again for performing on the streets, the judge ruled in the musician's favor on the grounds he had not specifically asked for contributions from passers-by.

Final years
Reneau's recording career ended by his mid-20s, and over the next decade he eked out a living on Knoxville's streets. After contracting rheumatism in his arms, he was no longer able to play guitar or banjo, and in 1932, his brother-in-law, who was also blind, began accompanying him, playing guitar while Reneau sang along. By the late 1930s, Reneau's health had deteriorated further, and he died of pneumonia on June 5, 1938, at the age of 36.

Recordings
Following are all of Reneau's releases for the Vocalion label as well as his recordings on Edison with Gene Austin as the Blue Ridge Duo. Note that a few of Reneau's Vocalion recordings featured Tennessee champion fiddler "Uncle Am" Stuart. This listing does not include Reneau's releases for miscellaneous labels under various pseudonyms, nor does it cover his work with Lester McFarland.

Vocalion Records as solo artist

 Arkansaw Traveler, 1924
 Bad Companions, 1925
 Baggage Coach Ahead, The, 1925
 Bald Headed End of the Broom, 1924
 Birmingham, 1924
 Blue Ridge Blues, 1924
 C. & O. Wreck, The, 1924
 Casey Jones, 1924
 Fatal Wedding, The, 1925
 Gambling on the Sabbath Day, 1925
 Hand of Fate, The, 1925
 Here, Rattler, Here (Calling the Dog), 1924
 I'm Glad My Wife's in Europe, 1925
 I've Got the Railroad Blues, 1924
 Jack and Joe, 1925
 Jesse James, 1924
 Letter Edged in Black, The, 1925
 Life's Railway to Heaven, 1924
 Lightning Express, The, 1925
 Little Brown Jug, 1924
 Little Rosewood Casket, 1925
 Lonesome Road Blues, 1924
 Love Always Has Its Way, 1925
 May I Sleep in Your Barn Tonight, Mister?, 1925
 My Redeemer, 1924
 New Market Wreck, The, 1924
 Old Man on the Hill, The, 1925
 Old Rugged Cross, The	1925
 On Top of Old Smoky, 1925
 Prisoner's Song, The, 1925
 Railroad Lover, 1925
 Red Wing, 1924
 Rock All Our Babies to Sleep, 1925
 Rovin' Gambler, 1925
 Sinking of the Titanic, The, 1925
 Smoky Mountain Blues, 1924
 Softly and Tenderly, 1925
 Susie Ann, 1924
 Turkey in the Straw, 1924
 Two Orphans, The, 1925
 Weeping Willow Tree, The, 1925
 We're Floating Down The Stream Of Time, 1925
 When I Shall Cross Over the Dark Rolling Tide, 1925
 When the Work's All Done This Fall, 1925
 When You and I Were Young, Maggie, 1924
 Wild and Reckless Hobo, 1925
 Wild Bill Jones, 1925
 Woman"s Suffrage, 1925
 Wreck of the Southern 97, The, 1924
 You Will Never Miss Your Mother Until She Is Gone, 1924

Edison Records as Blue Ridge Duo

 Arkansas Traveler, 1924
 Blue Ridge Blues, 1925
 Life's Railway to Heaven, 1925
 Little Brown Jug, 1924
 Lonesome Road Blues, 1925
 Sinking of the Titanic, 1926
 Susie Ann, 1924
 Turkey in the Straw, 1924
 Wreck of the C. & O., 1926
 You Will Never Miss Your Mother Until She Is Gone, 1925

References

1902 births
1938 deaths
People from Knoxville, Tennessee
Country musicians from Tennessee
American street performers
Blind musicians
20th-century American singers
American male guitarists
American harmonica players
American banjoists